The Bakery Girl of Monceau is a 1962 short film written and directed by Éric Rohmer. The film was the first of Rohmer's Six Moral Tales ("Contes moraux"), which consisted of two shorts and four feature films.

Plot 
A man who sees and falls in love with a woman he passes in the street, but he does not know how to talk to her. When he finally speaks to her, she disappears and he conducts a daily search for her in the same area. During his search, he acquires a habit of visiting a bakery for a snack. Over time, the "girl" in the bakery becomes interested in him and he starts flirting with her and eventually convinces her to go on a date with him. Before the date begins, he runs into the woman that he was searching for and is forced to choose between them.

Cast 
 Barbet Schroeder: young man
 Bertrand Tavernier: young man's voiceover narration
 Claudine Soubrier: Jacqueline
 Michèle Girardon: Sylvie
 Fred Junk: Schmidt
 Michel Mardore: Client

Narrative structure 
The narrative structure of The Girl at the Monceau Bakery and the other five "Moral Tales" begins with the main character (a man), who is committed to a woman, meeting and being tempted by a second woman, but renouncing her for the first woman.

Meaning of "Moral" 
According to Rohmer:
My intention was not to film raw events, but the narrative that someone makes of them. The story, the choice of facts, their organization... not the treatment that I could have made them submit to. One of the reasons that these Tales are called "Moral" is that physical actions are almost completely absent: everything happens in the head of the narrator.

Most of the film is told through the narrator. The main character is played by Barbet Schroeder, but was dubbed by Bertrand Tavernier, whose voice Rohmer judged more appropriate for the very literary voice-over.

Using the word "moral" does not mean that there is a moral in the story. According to Rohmer: So Contes Moraux doesn't really mean that there's a moral contained in them, even though there might be one and all the characters in these films act according to certain moral ideas that are fairly clearly worked out.

Also, Rohmer said:
They are films which a particular feeling is analyzed and where even the characters themselves analyze their feelings and are very introspective. That's what Conte Moral means.

Themes 
 Guilt - that all are guilty and none are completely innocent.
 Love, desire, and free will - this is marked by the conflict within the protagonist. The conflict is the debate of being in another's arms. They "prefer to emphasize the possibility of choice rather than the activity of it".
 "Courtly Love" - according to James Monaco, there is an "inborn suffering" for the protagonist caused by "excessive meditation upon the beauty of the opposite sex". It is a "love based in idleness".

Setting 
In each of the Six Moral Tales, Rohmer only filmed during the time and in the place that the film was set. There was no use of sets.

Sound 
There is no nondiegetic music, only what is played in the background as part of the setting (i.e., cars, people walking by, music playing in the background at a party). Also, there is an emphasis on dialogue and frequent use of voice-over narration. The Girl at the Monceau Bakery contains no music, and the only sound that interrupts the sounds in the background is that of the narrator.

References

External links 
 
 
 Eric Rohmer: Blueprints for a Brilliant Oeuvre an essay by Ginette Vincendeau at the Criterion Collection

1963 films
1963 drama films
French black-and-white films
Films directed by Éric Rohmer
French drama short films
Films produced by Barbet Schroeder
Films about food and drink
1960s French-language films
1960s French films